The David Eccles School of Business is located on the University of Utah campus in Salt Lake City, Utah. The school was founded as the "School of Commerce & Finance" in 1917 and subsequently changed its name to "School of Business" in 1927, although business classes were taught through the Economics & Sociology department at the University starting in 1896.  The school currently offers nine undergraduate majors, four MBA programs, nine specialized master's programs, a Ph.D. program, and executive education offerings. The Eccles School has nearly 40,000 alumni in all 50 U.S. states and many countries.

The Eccles School is also home to several prominent centers and institutes including the Marriner S. Eccles Institute for Economics and Quantitative Analysis, Lassonde Entrepreneur Institute, the Kem C. Gardner Policy Institute, the Goff Strategic Leadership Center, and the Ivory-Boyer Real Estate Center.

History 

In 1896, University of Utah business education was part of the Economics and Sociology Department. The need to expand academic offerings led the University of Utah to establish the School of Commerce and Finance in 1917. In its first year, 126 students enrolled, and over the next 80 years, the enrollment figure increased over 25 times. Today, the David Eccles School of Business educates more than 4,500 students in six departments of study.

In 1927, the name of the school was changed to "College of Business" and course divisions included Accounting, Distribution and Production, Finance, and Economics. In 1933, the first graduate degrees were awarded. The College of Business was officially accredited by the American Association of Collegiate Schools of Business in August 1936. In 1955, the MBA program was instituted at the College of Business. The School's first MBA degrees were awarded in 1957, and its departments were reorganized to Accounting, Finance, Management, and Marketing.

In 1991, a $15 million endowment was given by David Eccles’ youngest daughter, Emma Eccles Jones, to honor the legacy of her late father. With that gift, the school was renamed to the David Eccles School of Business. David Eccles was a leading pioneer industrialist who, in the latter part of the 19th century, founded 48 businesses in various sectors throughout Utah, Idaho, Oregon, and Wyoming.

Campus 

The University of Utah campus is located on the lower bench of the Rocky Mountains within a 30-minute drive of seven ski resorts and a few hours' drive from five national parks. The David Eccles School of Business is located on the southern end of campus. Currently, the Eccles School campus includes the Business Classroom Building (BuC), the C. Roland Christensen Center (CRCC),  the Spencer Fox Eccles Business Building (SFEBB), and the Robert H. and Katherine B. Garff Building, which opened in Fall 2018.

The SFEBB, the school's flagship building, broke ground in 2011 and had a complete project cost of $72 million. It was the first LEED Certified building on the University of Utah's main campus. Its doors were opened to faculty and staff in November 2012 and to students attending class in January 2013.

Academics

The Eccles School is home to a robust offering of programs at both the graduate and undergraduate level.

The Eccles School's MBA program has four completion options, including a traditional, two-year Full-Time MBA; a two-year weeknight-based Professional MBA (PMBA) program with an average work experience of 5 years; a two-year MBA Online program with maximum scheduling flexibility; and a 21-month, weekend-based Executive MBA (EMBA) program, designed for experienced professionals with an average work experience of 14 years.

The Executive MBA program was most recently ranked No. 24 nationally by the Financial Times. It is the only school in Utah to be ranked in the Financial Times’ top-100 Executive MBA programs. The Professional MBA program was most recently ranked No. 60 in the U.S. by U.S. News & World Report. The Full-Time MBA program is ranked No. 44 in the U.S. and No. 22 for public schools by U.S. News & World Report. The MBA Online program is ranked No. 14 in the world by the Princeton Review and No. 25 in the U.S. by U.S. News & World Report.

The Eccles School's array of specialized graduate degrees includes an MS Information Systems with on-campus and online options, Utah's only MS Business Analytics program, the Master of Business Creation for serious entrepreneurs, an MS Finance, a Master of Real Estate Development, a Master of Accounting, and a Master of Healthcare Administration with full-time and professional options.

The MS Business Analytics was most recently ranked No. 10 in the U.S. by the TFE Times and is Utah's only ranked business analytics master's degree. The Financial Times has ranked the MS Finance No. 1 in the U.S. for value for money, No. 11 in the U.S. overall, and top 55 worldwide for three consecutive years. The Master of Accounting program is ranked No. 34 in the U.S. and No. 8 in the West by the Public Accounting Report. The Master of Healthcare Administration program is accredited by the Commission on the Accreditation of Healthcare Management Education (CAHME).

The Eccles School's nine undergraduate majors include: finance, accounting, information systems, marketing, management, entrepreneurship, business administration, operations & supply chain, and quantitative analysis of markets and organizations. Undergraduate students can also select from four minors: business, entrepreneurship, information systems, and professional selling & business development.

In 2019, the Eccles School added Lassonde+X, a 3-course undergraduate program for students to learn about the entrepreneurial mindset. All students at the University of Utah are welcome to enroll in this program.

The undergraduate and graduate entrepreneurship curriculum is ranked top-25 in the U.S. by the Princeton Review.

Rankings

 Executive MBA: No. 24 in the U.S. and No. 4 in the West (Financial Times, 2017)
Professional MBA: No. 60 in the U.S. (U.S. News & World Report, 2018)
MBA Online: No. 14 in the world (Princeton Review, 2018), No. 25 in the U.S. (U.S. News & World Report, 2018)
Full-time MBA: No. 44 in the U.S., No. 22 for public schools (U.S. News & World Report, 2018)
MS Finance: No. 11 in the U.S., No. 53 in the world (Financial Times, 2018)
MS Business Analytics: No. 10 in the U.S. (TFE Times, 2017)
Master of Accounting: No. 34 in the U.S., No. 8 in the West (Public Accounting Report, 2017)
Undergraduate Accounting: No. 30 in the U.S., No. 8 in the West (Public Accounting Report, 2017)
Graduate and Undergraduate Entrepreneurship: Top-25 in the U.S. (The Princeton Review, 2017)

People

Alumni 

 Jerry Atkin, President and CEO SkyWest Airlines
 Stephen Covey, Co-founder of FranklinCovey and author of the best-selling book, "The Seven Habits of Highly Effective People"
 Spencer Eccles, former chairman and chief executive officer of First Security Corporation
 Teppo Felin, Professor of Strategy at the University of Oxford
 Robert H. Garff, Ken Garff Corporation
 Jake Garn, U.S. Senator, Space Shuttle astronaut on STS-51-D
 Pierre Lassonde, former president of Newmont Mining Corporation and chairman of the World Gold Council
 J. W. Marriott, Jr., Chairman and CEO of Marriott International
 Robert A. "Bob" McDonald,  United States Secretary of Veterans Affairs; retired Chairman, President, and CEO of Procter & Gamble
 David Neeleman, Founder and chairman of JetBlue Airways, Azul Brazilian Airlines, co-founder of Morris Air

See also
 List of business schools in the United States
 List of United States graduate business school rankings

References 

University of Utah
Business schools in Utah
Educational institutions established in 1896
University subdivisions in Utah
1896 establishments in Utah